Balsu Gida Sanayi ve Ticaret A.S. is a producer, processor and exporter of hazelnuts and its derivatives. Its headquarters is located in Istanbul's Beykoz district.

History 
Its history dates back to 1979, when its founder Cuneyd Zapsu established a company which supplied hazelnuts from Turkey to international markets. The modern company was founded in 1984 as a privately held business based in Istanbul. Balsu is reaching global markets through its affiliates: Balsu Europe GmbH in Germany, Balsu USA Inc in Florida, USA; and Balsu Asia in Hong-Kong.

Production 
Today the company is one of the main hazelnut producers in Turkey, its factory in Sakarya is able to process about 55,000 tons of hazelnuts annually. Balsu created together with Nestlé and Olam International a program to enhance the labor standards in the hazelnut industry in Turkey.

References 

Hazelnuts
Turkish companies established in 1984